Diane van Es (born 22 March 1999) is a Dutch middle- and long-distance runner. She won the bronze medal in the 5000 metres at the 2021 European Under-23 Championships

Van Es is the Dutch record holder for the 10 km road race. She won three national titles (5000 m, 10 km).

Career
Diane Van Es competed internationally at youth level, winning the 3000 metres at the 2015 European Youth Olympic Festival held in Tbilisi, and placing 12th in that event at the 2017 European Under-20 Championships in Grosseto two years later.

In 2019, she represented Netherlands in the 5000 metres final at the European U23 Championships held in Gävle and was part of the gold medal-winning women's U23 Dutch team at the European Cross Country Championships in Lisbon.

Van Es established herself in the senior ranks with a 5000 m win at the 2020 Dutch Athletics Championships.

On 29 May 2021, she set a 5000 m personal best of 15:07.52 during the Next Generation Athletics meeting in Nijmegen, which qualified her for the postponed 2020 Tokyo Olympics.

Achievements

All information from World Athletics profile.

International competitions

Personal bests
 1500 metres – 4:09.74 (Pfungstadt 2022)
 1500 metres indoor – 4:14.81 (Dortmund 2022)
 3000 metres – 8:49.55 (Chorzów 2022)
 3000 metres indoor – 9:01.32 (Apeldoorn 2021)
 5000 metres – 15:07.52 (Nijmegen 2021)
 10,000 metres – 33:20.73 (Leiden 2020)
Road
 5 kilometres – 15:54 (Vienna 2021)
 10 kilometres – 30.29 (Schoorl 2023) 
 10 miles – 54:44 (Amsterdam 2022)
 Half marathon – 1:10:50 (Breda 2022)

National titles
 Dutch Athletics Championships
 5000 metres: 2020, 2022
 Dutch 10km Championships
 10 km: 2023

References

External links
 

1999 births
Living people
Athletes from Rotterdam
Dutch female long-distance runners
Dutch Athletics Championships winners
Dutch female cross country runners
Athletes (track and field) at the 2020 Summer Olympics
Olympic athletes of the Netherlands
20th-century Dutch women
21st-century Dutch women